The Oakland Athletics, formerly known as the Philadelphia and Kansas City Athletics, are a professional baseball team based in Oakland, California. The Athletics have played in the American League (AL) ever since the league formed in 1901.

The Athletics have won nine World Series titles, tied for third most in all of Major League Baseball. They are the only team apart from the New York Yankees to complete a World Series “three-peat”, which they did between 1972 and 1974. As the Philadelphia Athletics, the team had a golden period between 1909 and 1914, when they won three World Series, and had three consecutive 100-win seasons between 1929 and 1931 with two further titles. In the period from 1988 to 1990 the Athletics - now based in Oakland - played in three further World Series and won one, while from 1999 to 2006 they had winning records every season but never played in another World Series.

The Athletics have had some bad periods of failure to counterbalance these golden eras. During and after World War I, the Athletics had nine consecutive losing seasons including the lowest win percentage in post-1900 major league baseball of .235 in 1916 and only 36 wins in 1919. Between 1934 and 1967 in Philadelphia and later Kansas City the team had sequences of thirteen and fifteen consecutive losing seasons and overall won 2,119 games and lost 3,147 for a winning percentage of .402.

The Athletics have qualified for the postseason 29 times, fourth most among all thirty teams) while having an 18–20 postseason series record. They have reached the World Series fourteen times while having won it nine times.

Table key

Season-by-season records

Record by decade 
The following table describes the Athletics' MLB win–loss record by decade.

These statistics are from Baseball-Reference.com's Oakland Athletics History & Encyclopedia, and are current through 2021.

All-time records

These statistics are from Baseball-Reference.com's Oakland Athletics History & Encyclopedia, and are current as of October 5, 2022.

References

External links
 Athletics Year-By-Year Results at MLB.com
 Athletics Postseason Results at MLB.com

 
Oakland Athletics
Seasons